His Wife's Husband may refer to:
 His Wife's Husband (1922 British film), directed by George A. Cooper
 His Wife's Husband (1922 American film), directed by Kenneth S. Webb